Amor ("love" in Latin, Spanish and Portuguese) may refer to:

Music

Albums
Amor (Julio Iglesias album), 1982
Amor (Andrea Bocelli album), 2006

Songs
"Amor" (Los Auténticos Decadentes song), 2000
"Amor" (Cristian Castro song), 1995
"Amor" (Gabriel Ruiz song), recorded by Bing Crosby in 1944, Ben E. King in 1961, and Luis Miguel in 2001
"Amor" (Ricky Martin song), 2001

Other uses
 Amor (name), a list of notable people with the name
 Amor, the Roman deity Cupid
The land of the ancient Amorites, also known as Amurru
1221 Amor, an asteroid
Amor asteroid, a group of near-Earth asteroids named after 1221 Amor
Amor (automobile), a German car
Amor Vincit Omnia (Caravaggio), 17th-century painting
Amor (film), a 1940 Argentine comedy film
 WPAT-FM, branded as 93.1 Amor, a radio station in Paterson, New Jersey
 WAMR-FM, branded as 107.5 Amor,a radio station in Miami,Florida

See also
Amor Amor (disambiguation)
Amora (disambiguation)
Amore (disambiguation)
Emor
Love (disambiguation)